Meredith Evans is an Australian Paralympic swimmer. At the 1984 New York/Stoke Mandeville Paralympics, she won a silver medal in the Women's 100 m Breaststroke A4 event and four bronze medals in the Women's 100 m Backstroke A4, Women's 100 m Freestyle A4, Women's 400 m Freestyle A4, and Women's 200 m Individual Medley A4 events.

References

Female Paralympic swimmers of Australia
Swimmers at the 1984 Summer Paralympics
Medalists at the 1984 Summer Paralympics
Paralympic silver medalists for Australia
Paralympic bronze medalists for Australia
Paralympic medalists in swimming
Australian female freestyle swimmers
Australian female backstroke swimmers
Australian female breaststroke swimmers
Australian female medley swimmers
20th-century Australian women
Year of birth missing (living people)
Living people